Protilemoides buergersi is a species of beetle in the family Cerambycidae, and the only species in the genus Protilemoides. It was described by Kriesche in 1923.

References

Morimopsini
Beetles described in 1923